Martín Barba, (born December 2, 1989) is a Mexican actor and singer, known for his character Benjamín Casanegra in the series Último año.

Career 
Barba is a graduate of acting academy "CEA" of Televisa. He has participated in several Televisa productions. In 2013 he joined Telemundo, to participate in two soap operas.

Filmography

Films

Television

References

External links 

21st-century Mexican male actors
Mexican male film actors
Mexican male telenovela actors
Mexican male television actors
Living people
Male actors from Oaxaca
1989 births